North Tipperary County Council was the authority responsible for local government in the county of North Tipperary, Ireland. The council had 21 elected members. The head of the council had the title of Mayor. The county town was Nenagh.

Originally North Tipperary County Council held its meetings in Nenagh Courthouse. The county council relocated to a new facility, known as the Civic Offices, in 2005.

On 26 July 2011, the Minister for the Environment, Community and Local Government Phil Hogan announced the proposed merger of North Tipperary County Council and South Tipperary County Council. It was abolished on 3 June 2014 when the Local Government Reform Act 2014 was implemented. It was succeeded by Tipperary County Council.

For the purpose of elections the county was divided into four local electoral areas: Nenagh (6), Newport (5), Templemore (5), and Thurles (5).

References

Politics of North Tipperary
Former local authorities in the Republic of Ireland
History of County Tipperary
2014 disestablishments in Ireland